Nikolay Ezersky (born 8 May 1956, Palmino, Taborinsky District) is a Russian political figure, FSB lieutenant colonel, and a deputy of the 4th, 5th, 6th, 7th, and 8th State Dumas.
 
From 1980 to 1991, he was a member of the Communist Party of the Soviet Union. From 1982 to 1984, he served in the Soviet Army. In 1986, he was among the Chernobyl liquidators. From 2000 to 2003, he was the deputy of the Regional Duma of the Legislative Assembly of Sverdlovsk Oblast. In 2003, he was elected deputy of the 4th State Duma from the Ural Federal District constituency. In 2007, 2011, 2016, and 2021, he was re-elected for the 4th, 5th, 6th, 7th, and 8th State Dumas, respectively.

References
 

 

1956 births
Living people
Communist Party of the Russian Federation members
21st-century Russian politicians
Eighth convocation members of the State Duma (Russian Federation)
Seventh convocation members of the State Duma (Russian Federation)
Sixth convocation members of the State Duma (Russian Federation)
Fifth convocation members of the State Duma (Russian Federation)
Fourth convocation members of the State Duma (Russian Federation)
People from Sverdlovsk Oblast